Bartłomiej Bołądź (born 28 September 1994) is a Polish professional volleyball player. He represented Poland at the 2019 Nations League. At the professional club level, he plays for Trefl Gdańsk.

Career

Clubs
After graduating from SMS PZPS Spała, he signed a three–year contract with Cerrad Czarni Radom. After four seasons spent playing in Radom, he moved to the German team, VfB Friedrichshafen in July 2017.

Honours

Clubs
 National championships
 2017/2018  German SuperCup, with VfB Friedrichshafen
 2017/2018  German Cup, with VfB Friedrichshafen
 2018/2019  German SuperCup, with VfB Friedrichshafen
 2018/2019  German Cup, with VfB Friedrichshafen

References

External links

 
 Player profile at PlusLiga.pl 
 Player profile at Volleybox.net

1994 births
Living people
People from Czarnków-Trzcianka County
Sportspeople from Greater Poland Voivodeship
Polish men's volleyball players
Polish expatriate sportspeople in Germany
Expatriate volleyball players in Germany
Czarni Radom players
Ślepsk Suwałki players
Trefl Gdańsk players
Opposite hitters